Sheykh Jaber (also Romanized as Sheykh Jāber) is a village in Qoltuq Rural District, in the Central District of Zanjan County, Zanjan Province, Iran. At the 2006 census, its population was 311, in 67 families.

References 

Populated places in Zanjan County